Frédéric-Auguste Cazals (1865–1941) was a French writer and illustrator, also notable as one of the closest friends of Paul Verlaine from 1886 to Verlaine's death.

Works 
 Le jardin des ronces : poèmes et chansons du pays latin, préface de Rachilde, avant-propos et notes de Serge Fauchereau, Paris, Somogy, 1995 
 Les derniers jours de Paul Verlaine, avec Gustave Le Rouge, préface de Maurice Barrès, Slatkine, 1983 

1865 births
1941 deaths
French illustrators